The Ob Plateau (Priobskoye Plato), is one of the great plateaus of Siberia. Administratively it falls within Altai Krai and Novosibirsk Oblast, Siberian Federal District, Russia. The plateau is named after the Ob River and is part of its basin.

Most of the territory of the plateau has been agriculturally developed, yielding grain crops as well as industrial crops.

Geography
The Ob Plateau is located in Altai Krai and Novosibirsk Oblast at the southern edge of the West Siberian Plain. It extends roughly to the north of the foothills of the Altai Mountains along the left bank of the north-flowing Ob River. To the west it descends gradually to the Kulunda Plain. 

Chernozem soils predominate in the open steppe spaces of the plateau.

Hydrography
Some of the main rivers of the plateau are the Aley, Barnaulka, Kulunda, Burla, Karasuk, Bagan and Kasmala among others. Lakes Bolshoye Gorkoye and Maloye Gorkoye have briny waters.

Flora  
There are forests made up mostly of birch in the ravines, as well as remnants of coniferous taiga in higher areas. Wetlands and lakes are common in the river valleys cutting across the plateau.

See also 
 Geography of Russia § Topography and drainage

References

External links

Федеральное государственное автономное образовательное учреждение

West Siberian Plain
Landforms of Altai Krai
Landforms of Novosibirsk Oblast